Nueil may refer to several communes in France:
 Nueil-les-Aubiers, Deux-Sèvres
 Nueil-sous-Faye, Vienne
 Nueil-sur-Layon, Maine-et-Loire